The 2022–23 season is the 124th season in the existence of SC Freiburg and the club's seventh consecutive season in the top flight of German football. In addition to the domestic league, SC Freiburg are participating in this season's edition of the DFB-Pokal and the UEFA Europa League. The season covers the period from 1 July 2022 to 30 June 2023.

Players

Out on loan

Transfers

In

Out

Pre-season and friendlies

Competitions

Overall record

Bundesliga

League table

Results summary

Results by round

Matches 
The league fixtures were announced on 17 June 2022.

DFB-Pokal

UEFA Europa League

Group stage 

The draw for the group stage was held on 26 August 2022.

Knockout phase

Round of 16 
The draw for the round of 16 was held on 24 February 2023.

Statistics

Appearances and goals

|-
! colspan=14 style=background:#dcdcdc; text-align:center| Goalkeepers

|-
! colspan=14 style=background:#dcdcdc; text-align:center| Defenders 

|-
! colspan=14 style=background:#dcdcdc; text-align:center| Midfielders 

 

|-
! colspan=14 style=background:#dcdcdc; text-align:center| Forwards

|-
! colspan=14 style=background:#dcdcdc; text-align:center| Players transferred out during the season

Goalscorers

Last updated: 26 February 2023

References

SC Freiburg seasons
SC Freiburg
SC Freiburg